Dischides is a genus of molluscs belonging to the family Gadilidae.

The species of this genus are found in Eurasia, Northern Africa and Australia.

Species
Species:

Dischides atlantideus (Nicklès, 1955)
Dischides belcheri Pilsbry & Sharp, 1898
Dischides belenae Scarabino, 2008
Dischides celeciai Scarabino, 2008
Dischides dartevellei (Nicklès, 1979)
Dischides dichelus (R.B.Watson, 1879)
Dischides hintoni Lamprell & Healy, 1998
Dischides leloeuffi (Nicklès, 1979)
Dischides minutus (H.Adams, 1872)
Dischides montrouzieri Scarabino, 2008
Dischides ovalis (Boissevain, 1906)
Dischides politus (S.Wood, 1842)
Dischides prionotus (R.B.Watson, 1879)
Dischides splendens Raines, 2002
Dischides viperidens (Melvill & Standen, 1896)
Dischides yateensis Scarabino, 1955

References

Molluscs